
Gmina Dobrodzień, German Gemeinde Guttentag is an urban-rural gmina (administrative district) in Olesno County, Opole Voivodeship, in south-western Poland.

Since 2009 the commune has been officially bilingual in German and Polish due to the large German minority in the area, many ethnic Germans have remained despite the area being transferred to Poland after World War II.

Villages
The commune contains the villages and settlements of:

Dobrodzień
Bąki
Błachów
Bzinica Nowa
Bzinica Stara
Główczyce
Gosławice
Klekotna
Kocury
Kolejka
Ligota Dobrodzieńska
Makowczyce
Malichów
Myślina
Pietraszów
Pludry
Rzędowice
Szemrowice
Turza
Warłów
Zwóz

Neighbouring gminas
Gmina Dobrodzień is bordered by the gminas of Ciasna, Kolonowskie, Olesno, Ozimek, Pawonków, Zawadzkie and Zębowice.

Twin towns – sister cities

Gmina Dobrodzień is twinned with:
 Chortkiv, Ukraine
 Haan, Germany

References

Dobrodzien
Olesno County
Bilingual communes in Poland